Andre Lamont Brown (born August 21, 1966) is a former American football wide receiver in the National Football League. He was signed by the Miami Dolphins as an undrafted free agent in 1989. He played college football at Miami. In 1988, he hauled in 47 catches for 746 yards and 8 TD.

References

1966 births
Living people
American football wide receivers
Miami Hurricanes football players
Miami Dolphins players
Players of American football from Chicago